was a Japanese actor, action director, martial artist and sword fight arranger. He served as a sword fight arranger in almost all of the Taiga drama series on NHK in his lifetime. In 1963, he founded stunt performers production company Wakakoma action club.

His final appearance as an actor was in the 2016 Taiga drama series Sanada Maru, he played the role of Takeda Shingen. He was posthumously awarded a Lifetime Achievement Award at the 4th Japan Action Awards.

Selected filmography

As an actor
 Taiga drama
 Ten to Chi to (1969) as Morozumi Torasada
 Kaze to Kumo to Niji to (1976) as Fujiwara no Hidesatos vassal
 Dokuganryū Masamune (1987) as Matsubara Tamon
 Hana no Ran (1994) as Asakura Takakage
 Mōri Motonari (1997) as Shinagawa Daizen
 Kōmyō ga Tsuji (2006) as Takenouchi Soemon
 Tenchijin (2009) as Kamiizumi Hidetsuna
 Sanada Maru (2016) as Takeda Shingen
 Taiyō ni Hoero! (1972) as an Assassin (ep.1)
 Oretachi wa Tenshi da! (1979) (ep.16)

As a sword fight arranger or Action director
 Taikōki (1965)
 Minamoto no Yoshitsune (1966)
 Lady Snowblood: Love Song of Vengeance (1973)
 Kunitori Monogatari (1973)
 Daitsuiseki (1978)
 Kusa Moeru (1979)
 Oshin (1983)
 Tokugawa Ieyasu (1983)
 Ghost Warrior a.k.a. Swordkill (1984)
 Sanada Taiheiki (1985)
 Wuthering Heights (1988)
 Aoi (2000)
 Shinsengumi! (2004)
 Yoshitsune (2005)
 Kōmyō ga Tsuji (2006)
 Fūrin Kazan (2007)
 Ryōmaden (2010)
 Gō (2011)
 Taira no Kiyomori (2012)
 Yae's Sakura (2013)
 Gunshi Kanbei (2014)
 Hana Moyu (2015)

Other appearances
 Weapon Masters (ep.5 Katana)

Award
 Japan Action Award for Lifetime Achievement Award (2016)

References

External links
Wakakoma Agency 
 

20th-century Japanese male actors
21st-century Japanese male actors
Japanese ninjutsu practitioners
1939 births
2015 deaths